Salih Mahmoud Osman (born 1957 in Darfur) is a Sudanese human rights lawyer. 

Osman is well known for having provided free legal representation to hundreds of victims of ethnic violence (human rights activist) in Sudan over more than two decades. He is from the Jebel Mara area in central Darfur, western Sudan. He has been widely honored for his work on human rights issues in Sudan, receiving the Human Rights Watch award in 2005, the International Human Rights Award from the American Bar Association in 2006, and was included in European Voices 50 most influential persons in Europe in 2007. Also in 2007 the European Parliament voted unanimously to award him the Sakharov Prize for Freedom of Thought. 

He was detained three times for his courageous advocacy in defense of human rights, but was never charged with any offense. 

In 2005, he was appointed to the National Assembly of Sudan where he works to promote legal reform and establishment of the rule of law in Sudan.

References
"Sudanese lawyer Salih Mahmoud Osman wins EU human rights award", International Herald-Tribune, Oct. 25, 2007
"Human Rights Watch Honors Sudanese Activist", Human Rights Watch, Oct. 27, 2005
"Sudanese Government Forces Detain Rights Advocate for Defending Human Rights in Darfur", Human Rights First, July 8, 2004
 "International Human Rights Award," American Bar Association
 "European of the Year 2007" European Voices.

1957 births
Living people
People from Darfur
Sudanese Muslims
Sudanese lawyers
Sudanese politicians
Members of the National Assembly (Sudan)
Sakharov Prize laureates